Desi is a 2000 Dutch documentary film by director Maria Ramos, featuring the 11-year-old Dutch girl named Desi. Coming from a dysfunctional family, her daily life is full of insecurities, and she is therefore relying on the help of social services in Amsterdam.

Awards
 Gouden Kalf award Best Documentary – Long (2001)
 IDFA audience award (2000)

External links 
 

Dutch documentary films
2000 films
Documentary films about children
2000s Dutch-language films
2000 documentary films